Alyaksandr Pyatrovich Hutar (born 18 April 1989) is a Belarusian professional footballer.

Club career

While playing for Chornomorets Odesa, in September of 2017 Hutar was recognized as a player of the month in the Ukrainian Premier League.

International
Hutar was the starting goaltender for the Belarus U21 side that finished in 3rd place at the 2011 UEFA European Under-21 Football Championship and earned qualification for the 2012 Summer Olympics.
In July 2011, he received his first call-up to the senior team for the friendly match against Bulgaria, but was not selected to play.
Hutar was the main goalkeeper for the Belarus U23 team that participated in the 2012 Toulon Tournament. He made his debut for the senior national team on 25 March 2013, keeping a clean sheet in the 2:0 win over Canada in a friendly match.

Honours

Club
BATE Borisov
Belarusian Premier League champion: 2008, 2009, 2010, 2011, 2012
Belarusian Cup winner: 2009–10
Belarusian Super Cup winner: 2010, 2011

Dinamo Brest
Belarusian Premier League champion: 2019
Belarusian Cup winner: 2017–18
Belarusian Super Cup winner: 2018, 2019

Shakhtyor Soligorsk
Belarusian Premier League champion: 2020, 2021
Belarusian Super Cup winner: 2021

Individual
Belarusian Footballer of the Year: 2011

References

External links

 
 Profile at official BATE website
 

1989 births
Living people
Footballers from Minsk
Belarusian footballers
Association football goalkeepers
Belarus international footballers
Olympic footballers of Belarus
Footballers at the 2012 Summer Olympics
Belarusian expatriate footballers
Expatriate footballers in Russia
Expatriate footballers in Ukraine
Belarusian expatriate sportspeople in Russia
Belarusian expatriate sportspeople in Ukraine
Belarusian Premier League players
Russian Premier League players
Ukrainian Premier League players
FC BATE Borisov players
FC Dinamo Minsk players
FC Orenburg players
FC Tosno players
FC Chornomorets Odesa players
FC Dynamo Brest players
FC Shakhtyor Soligorsk players